Clifford "Chris" J. Graham (18 March 1900 – 24 May 1986) was a Canadian boxer, born in Toronto, who competed in the 1920s. As a bantamweight, he won the silver medal at the 1920 Summer Olympics, losing to Clarence Walker in the final. Four years later in Paris, he once again represented his native country at the Summer Olympics. This time he was eliminated in the second round of the lightweight class after losing his fight to Ben Rothwell. Graham was affiliated with Riverside Athletic Club of Toronto.

1920 Olympic results
Below is the record of Chris Graham, a Canadian bantamweight boxer who competed at the 1920 Antwerp Olympics:

 Round of 16: bye
 Quarterfinal: defeated Henri Ricard (France)
 Semifinal: defeated Henri Hébrant (Belgium)
 Final: lost to Clarence Walker (South Africa) - was awarded silver medal

Professional career
Graham later fought professionally in Canada, and the highlight of his pro career came on January 10, 1927, when he became the Canadian lightweight champion. He was later defeated and lost the belt to his former Olympic teammate Clarence Newton.

References

External links
Chris Graham's profile at Sports Reference.com

1900 births
1986 deaths
Boxers from Toronto
Bantamweight boxers
Lightweight boxers
Olympic boxers of Canada
Boxers at the 1920 Summer Olympics
Boxers at the 1924 Summer Olympics
Olympic silver medalists for Canada
Olympic medalists in boxing
Canadian male boxers
Medalists at the 1920 Summer Olympics